Third Sector New England (or TSNE) is a 501(c)(3) organization based in Boston, Massachusetts, providing management and leadership resources to fellow nonprofits.

Some of its current initiatives are:

Consulting and Coaching
Executive Transition and Search
Fiscal Sponsorship Services
Grants for Capacity Building
Management and Leadership Training
Multi-Tenant NonProfit Center
Organizational Transitions

Third Sector New England is oriented to progressive social change, and claims to uphold values such as cultural diversity and economic justice.

"TSNE also incubated and supported the development of the Nonprofit Quarterly magazine from 1997 through 2006, when it spun off as an independent publication."

References

External links
Third Sector New England

Non-profit organizations based in Boston
501(c)(3) organizations